The McDaniel-Johns Hopkins football rivalry is an American college football rivalry between the McDaniel Green Terror football team of McDaniel College and Johns Hopkins Blue Jays football team of Johns Hopkins University. Customarily it is the last game the regular season for both respective schools.

One of the oldest rivalry games in American college football, dating back to 1894. The McDaniel-Hopkins game has been played annually since 1947.

History
For many decades the best college football team in Maryland would get a trophy. Up until 1942 Maryland terrapins and Western Maryland college where the biggest rivalry in the state. After World War II Western Maryland college decided to no longer play against larger schools and instead play what is considered to be its “natural rivals.” As such a 1947 Western Maryland college and Johns Hopkins began the tradition of having the last game of the regular season be  played against each other. Starting in 1946 both schools joined the Mason-Dixon conference have always continued to be in the same conference together for football.

The night before the 1947 game a couple of Western Maryland Army Veterans came up with idea of abducting two Johns Hopkins freshmen. They had two Western Maryland College girls trick two 18 years old Hopkins freshmen into thinking they were going to a party at Goucher where there would be "women and beer." When the girls lead the Hopkins boys to the car they were tied up by some Western Maryland students. Then the two captured freshmen were brought out to a WMC pep rally where their heads were shaved and they were "properly humiliated." Then they were brought to a dorm room where they were tied to a bed and were given as much beer & burgers as they wanted. The next day, during the game's halftime, WMC brought out the Hopkins freshmen to midfield, where some Hopkins players took them back to the sidelines. The game ended in a 14–14 tie. It was reported that Hopkins freshmen were good sports about it. Western Maryland College had the same thing done to them by their old arch rival University of Maryland College Park about 10 years earlier.

Game Results
Rankings are complete from 2001 onwards.

See also  
 List of NCAA college football rivalry games

References

College football rivalry trophies in the United States
Johns Hopkins Blue Jays football
McDaniel Green Terror football
NCAA Division III football